John Allen Roush is an American academic administrator and football coach who served as the 20th president of Centre College from 1998 to 2020.

Early life and education 
An Ohio native, Roush graduated from Fairmont High School and holds a bachelor's degree in English with Omicron Delta Kappa honors from Ohio University, and a Master's and PhD from Miami University.

Career
Roush began his career at Miami University as an assistant football coach, and later became Executive Assistant to the President in 1976. After Miami University, Roush joined the staff of the University of Richmond in 1982.

During his twenty-two year presidency, Centre College established the Brown Fellows Program, the Bonner Scholars Program, and the Centre Scholars Program. Several buildings on campus were renovated, including the Campus Center, Sutcliffe Hall, Stuart Hall, Ruby Cheek House, the Norton Center for the Arts, and Young Hall. Several new buildings were added, including Cowan, Pearl Hall, and the Student Center. Roush also launched several successful fundraising campaigns, including A More Perfect Centre, which raised nearly $170 million. Enrollment also increased significantly during the time Roush was in the role.

In January 2021, Centre announced the addition of Roush to the football staff as the Colonels' running backs coach.

References

External links
 Biography from Centre College

Living people
Miami University alumni
Miami RedHawks football coaches
Presidents of Centre College
Centre Colonels football coaches
Centre College faculty
Year of birth missing (living people)